Ren Hanami is an American stage/screen/voice actress, writer, director and singer. Hanami is a recurring Guest Star on Disney's Bunk'd, and has appeared in TV shows such as Star Trek: Picard, Silicon Valley, This is Us, Criminal Minds and GLOW. Her first feature film role was Air Force One. She also appeared in the mini-series The Storm as Meteorologist Dawn Maleuga from Honolulu, Hawaii. She is the National Chairman of the SAG-AFTRA Asian Pacific American Media Committee and was inducted into the Asian Hall of Fame in 2021.

Hanami was born as Linda Maureen Hanna in Inglewood, California to Alice Akimi Nakano of Japanese descent from Kekaha, Kauai, Hawaii and an engineer James Arthur Hanna of Scottish descent from Foxboro, Massachusetts. The Hannas are descended from Clan Hannay in the southwest of Scotland complete with a 15th-century castle called Sorbie Tower.

Partial filmography 
The Bronx Zoo (TV series) – Test Supervisor (1987)
thirtysomething (1981) – (TV series) – Nurse (1988)
Love with a Twist (TV movie) – Mai (1989)
Tour of Duty (TV series) – Whore #1 / Whore #2 (1989)
The Hogan Family (TV series) – Floor Manager (1989)
On the Television (TV series) – Various (1990)
Knots Landing (TV series) – Receptionist (1990)
The Bakery (TV series) – Female Newscaster (as Linda Hanna) (1990)
Something to Live for: The Alison Gertz Story (TV movie) – Younger Nurse (1992)
One Woman's Courage (1987) (TV movie) – Newscaster (1994)
Cagney & Lacey: The Return (TV movie) – Margie (1994)
Profiler (TV series) – Newscaster (1996)
Air Force One – Reporter #4 (1997)
Permanent Midnight – TV Host (1998)
General Hospital (TV series) – Dean Ryan / Kim Chan (2005)
The Young and the Restless (TV series) – Bank Teller / Flight Attendant #1 / Ms. Lee (1989–2006)
ER (TV series) – NICU Nurse (2006)
Grey's Anatomy (TV series) – Ms. Chen (2008)
Silent Shame (video documentary) – Self (voice) (2009)
Without a Trace (TV series) – Neighbor (2009)
The Storm (TV Miniseries)- Dawn Maleuga (2009)
Southland (TV series)- Nurse (2011)
Private Practice (TV series)- Concierge (2011)
AAA Hawai'i (TV commercial)- Host (2008–present)
Pretty Little Liars (2016)
Silicon Valley (2015–2016)
Bitch (Feature Film) (2017)
Angie Tribeca (2017)
The Thundermans (2017)
Criminal Minds (2017)
Major Crimes (2017)
Here, Now (2017–2018)
S.W.A.T. (2017 TV series) (2017–2018)
Like Last Night (Short Film) (2017)
God's Not Dead: A Light in Darkness (2018)
Man with a Plan (TV series) (2018)
GLOW (TV series) (2018)
Shameless (U.S. TV series) (2018)
Santa Clarita Diet (2019)
13 Reasons Why (TV series) (2019)
Cherish the Day (TV series) (2020)
Cyberpunk 2077 (2020)
Raya and the Last Dragon (2021)
This Is Us (2021)
Star Trek: Picard (2022)
Animal Kingdom (2022)
Super Giant Robot Brothers (2022)
Unseen (2022)

Notable stage performances 
Land of Smiles - NGO Attorney, Achara Montri - Edinburgh Fringe Festival
South Pacific - with Reba McEntire and Brian Stokes Mitchell - The Hollywood Bowl

References

External links

Awards and nominations

Honors
2021 - Hanami is inducted into the Asian Hall of Fame "for her trailblazing career in the entertainment industry and advocacy for Asian Pacific Islander Americans through her work as the Chair of the SAG-AFTRA Asian Pacific Media Committee."

20th-century American actresses
21st-century American actresses
American film actresses
American television actresses
Living people
American people of Scottish descent
American actresses of Japanese descent
American film actors of Asian descent
Actresses from Inglewood, California
Musicians from Inglewood, California
Year of birth missing (living people)